Alfred Ablett  (3 August 1830 – 12 March 1897) was a British Army soldier and a Crimean War recipient of the Victoria Cross, the highest award for gallantry in the face of the enemy that can be awarded to British and Commonwealth forces. A soldier with the Grenadier Guards during the Crimean War, he was awarded the VC for his actions on 2 September 1855, during the siege of Sebastopol.

Early life
Alfred Ablett was born on 3 August 1830, at Weybread, Suffolk, to Samuel and Elizabeth Ablett. He was baptised just over a month later on 3 September. According to the 1841 England, Wales and Scotland census, he had four older brothers, one younger brother and two younger sisters.

Military service
Ablett joined the army on 20 February 1850 at the age of 19 years and five months, being assigned to the 3rd Battalion, Grenadier Guards. He would go on to serve in the Crimean War, seeing action at the Battle of Alma, Battle of Inkerman and the Battle of Balaclava, earning service bars for each. But it was at the rank of private in early September 1855 when he performed the deed which would earn him a Victoria Cross for bravery while in the trenches at the siege of Sebastopol.

His VC citation in the London Gazette reads:

He was nominated for the award by his company captain who witnessed the event, and was among 29 men to be presented with the medal on 26 June 1857 by Queen Victoria. Ablett later achieved the rank of sergeant. He was one of two members of the 3rd Battalion, Grenadier Guards who earned the Victoria Cross during the Crimean War, the other being Private Anthony Palmer.

Later life and legacy
In 1868, he was accused of attempting to kill himself with a rifle, but was found not guilty by a jury at a court in Norwich. He had served for 26 years in the London Dock Police following his departure from military service, reaching the rank of sergeant. He died at his home on East India Road, Poplar, London on 12 March 1897 and was buried in St Andrew's churchyard, Weybread.

His Victoria Cross is held by the Grenadier Guards Regimental Headquarters, Wellington Barracks, London, England, after being sold back for £62 (at the time), and his family is now in possession of a replica. His medal would now sell for approximately £250,000.

References

External links

1830 births
1897 deaths
People from Mid Suffolk District
Grenadier Guards soldiers
British Army personnel of the Crimean War
British recipients of the Victoria Cross
Crimean War recipients of the Victoria Cross
Recipients of the Distinguished Conduct Medal
British Army recipients of the Victoria Cross